Cristine Prosperi is a Canadian actress. She is known for portraying Imogen Moreno on the long-running television series Degrassi. She also starred as Aria on the web series Totally Amp'd, and as Mikayla Walker in the TeenNick television series Open Heart.

Career
Prosperi was born in Toronto, and debuted on screen when she was three in an advertisement for Unico. A singer and dancer, she began her acting career with small roles in the 2007 movies Stir of Echoes: The Homecoming and Your Beautiful Cul de Sac Home. In 2009, she guest starred on the Family Channel comedy series The Latest Buzz.

In 2011, Prosperi was cast as Imogen Moreno on the long-running television teen drama Degrassi, a role she began playing during the show's eleventh season. She remained on Degrassi until the end of the show in 2015 with the fourteenth season. For her performance, she won the Best Performance in a TV Series – Leading Young Actress Award at Young Artist Awards in 2012, and she attracted a following in the LGBT community.

In 2012, Prosperi starred in the web series Totally Amp'd as Aria, and in 2013, she starred in the Nickelodeon television movie Nicky Deuce. In 2015, she appeared in the TeenNick series Open Heart, where she played the role of the bright and gossipy Mikayla Walker. In 2017, she starred as Destiny in the Bring It On film Bring It On: Worldwide Cheersmack.

In 2016, she starred in the Lifetime movie His Double Life. Since 2017, she continued to act in Lifetime films.

Filmography

Awards and nominations

References

External links
 

1993 births
Living people
21st-century Canadian actresses
Actresses from Toronto
Canadian child actresses
Canadian film actresses
Canadian television actresses
Canadian people of Greek descent
Canadian people of Italian descent